Samarium-147 (147Sm or Sm-147) is an isotope of samarium, making up 15% of natural samarium. It is an extremely long-lived radioisotope, with a half-life of 1.06×1011 years, although this can range from 1.05×1011 to 1.17×1011 years. It is mainly used in radiometric dating.

Uses 

Samarium-147 is used in samarium-neodymium dating. The method of isochron dating is used to find the date at which a rock (or group of rocks) are formed. The Sm-Nd isochron plots the ratio of radiogenic 143Nd to non-radiogenic 144Nd against the ratio of the parent isotope 147Sm to the non-radiogenic isotope 144Nd. 144Nd is used to normalize the radiogenic isotope in the isochron because it is a stable and relatively abundant neodymium isotope.

The Sm-Nd isochron is defined by the following equation:

 

where:

 t is the age of the sample, 
 λ is the decay constant of 147Sm,
 (eλt−1) is the slope of the isochron which defines the age of the system.

Alternatively, one can assume that the material formed from mantle material which was following the same path of evolution of these ratios as chondrites, and then again the time of formation can be calculated (see Samarium–neodymium dating#The CHUR model).

See also 

 Isotopes of samarium
 Neodymium-143
 Samarium-neodymium dating

References 

Samarium-147
Radionuclides used in radiometric dating